Bodomzor is a station of the Tashkent Metro on Yunusobod Line. It was opened on 24 October 2001 as part of the inaugural section of the line, between Ming Orik and  Habib Abdullayev.

Gallery

References

Tashkent Metro stations
Railway stations opened in 2001
2001 establishments in Uzbekistan